Stockholm Township may refer to:

 Stockholm Township, Crawford County, Iowa
 Stockholm Township, Minnesota
 Stockholm Township, Grant County, South Dakota, see Grant County, South Dakota

Township name disambiguation pages